Aphanothece is a genus of cyanobacteria belonging to the family Aphanothecaceae.

The genus has cosmopolitan distribution.

Species:

Aphanothece atro-crustacea 
Aphanothece bullosa 
Aphanothece castagnei

References

Chroococcales
Cyanobacteria genera